This is a list of all (former) Member of the European Parliament for the Party for the Animals (PvdD)

Seats in the European Parliament

Alphabetical

Elected members of the European Parliament (from 1979)
Current members of the European Parliament are in bold.

European Parliament periods

2004-2009 
 

0 seats:

2009-2014 
 

0 seats:

2014-2019 
 

1 seat:
 Anja Hazekamp (fractievoorzitter)

2019-2024 
 

1 seat:
 Anja Hazekamp (fractievoorzitter)

References

Main